Harsanyi or Harsányi is a Hungarian surname. Notable people with the surname include:

Borbála Tóth Harsányi (born 1946), Hungarian handballer
David Harsanyi (born 1970), American journalist.
Gábor Harsányi (born 1945), Hungarian actor and voice actor
Gergely Harsányi (born 1981), Hungarian handballer
John Harsanyi (1920–2000), Hungarian-Australian-American economist and Nobel Prize winner
Janice Harsanyi (1929–2007), American soprano singer and college professor
Tibor Harsányi (1898–1954), Hungarian-born composer and pianist
Vera Harsányi (1919–??), Hungarian freestyle swimmer
Zoltán Harsányi (born 1987), Slovak footballer at Pécsi MFC
Zsolt Harsányi (1887–1943), Hungarian author, dramatist, translator, and writer

Hungarian-language surnames